Major-General Sir Donald Jay McMullen CB KBE DSO (1891 – 12 November 1967) was a British Army officer of the Royal Engineers. He served in both of the World Wars.

References 

 McMULLEN, Maj.-Gen. Sir Donald Jay', Who Was Who, A & C Black, 1920–2008; online edn, Oxford University Press, December 2007       accessed 21 Nov 2010

External links
National Portrait Gallery
London Gazette
London Gazette

British Army generals
1967 deaths
1891 births
Royal Engineers officers
Companions of the Distinguished Service Order
British Army personnel of World War II
British Army personnel of World War I